Harry Riley was a cricketer.

Harry Riley may also refer to:

Harry Riley (footballer)
Harry B. Riley, California State Controller

See also
Harold Riley (disambiguation)
Henry Riley (disambiguation)